The Return of Billy Jack is an unfinished movie. The film starred Tom Laughlin (who also directed), reprising his role as Billy Jack, and co-starred Rodney Harvey and Delores Taylor. The film was produced from December 1985 to early 1986 in New York City (with some scenes filmed in Central Park), with additional scenes filmed in Toronto.

Plot
Billy Jack takes on child pornographers in New York City.

Production
During the course of its filming, Laughlin suffered a head injury when a breakaway bottle malfunctioned while filming a scene in Toronto. By the time he recovered, funds to complete the film were depleted, and production never resumed. Laughlin originally planned to sell the film to a major studio, but plans either fell through or were never realized. At the time production stopped, only approximately 15 minutes of the motion picture had been filmed.

In addition, while filming was taking place in New York City, Laughlin broke up a street fight on Manhattan's West Side and made a citizen's arrest of a man following an argument over Laughlin's driving.

Aftermath
Laughlin died on December 12, 2013.

References

External links
Laughlin's official Billy Jack website
 

1980s unfinished films
Films shot in New York City
Films directed by Tom Laughlin
1980s English-language films